Grapes of Wrath may refer to:

Literature
 A phrase in the Bible's Book of Revelation, chapter 14 verse 19: "The angel swung his sickle on the earth, gathered its grapes and threw them into the great winepress of God's wrath."
The Grapes of Wrath, a 1901 novel by Mary Harriott Norris
The Grapes of Wrath, a 1939 novel by John Steinbeck

Music
a phrase from the first stanza of the "Battle Hymn of the Republic" by Julia Ward Howe
The Grapes of Wrath (band), a Canadian folk rock band of the 1980s and 1990s
 The Grapes of Wrath (album), the 1984 album by the band of the same name
 Grapes of Wrath (album), a 1983 album by British band Spear of Destiny
"Grapes of Wrath," a song by The Mission on their 1990 album Carved in Sand.
"Grapes of Wrath", a song by Weezer on their 2021 album OK Human

Military
Operation Grapes of Wrath, a 1996 Israeli military operation in South Lebanon

Movies, TV, theatre, opera
"Grapes of Wrath" (Black Books episode), third episode from series one of the 2000 sit-com Black Books
The Grapes of Wrath (film), a 1940 film adaptation of the Steinbeck novel directed by John Ford
The Grapes of Wrath (play), a 1988 play based on the Steinbeck novel
The Grapes of Wrath (opera), an opera based on the Steinbeck novel that premiered in 2007